No Heart Creek is a stream in the U.S. state of South Dakota. It takes its name from a Sioux named No Heart (no relation to No Heart, chief of the Iowa people in the 1850s).

See also
List of rivers of South Dakota

References

Rivers of Dewey County, South Dakota
Rivers of South Dakota